Tré Armstrong (born August 17, 1978) is a Canadian actress, choreographer and dancer.

Early life and education

Her early dance schooling at age five in ballet, tap and jazz dance techniques is what has shaped her into who she is today.

Career
Armstrong has appeared on the television programs Top of the Pops:, Canadian Idol, 106 & Park and the MTV Video Music Awards. Celebrities she has worked with include: Sean Combs, Hilary Duff, Missy Elliott, Jay-Z, Rihanna and Kreesha Turner. Armstrong has performed in multiple feature films, award shows, reality-based television shows, and all across the United States, Canada, St. Kitts, Australia, New Zealand, Europe and Japan. She is also one of the judges on So You Think You Can Dance Canada, and is in six episodes of The Next Step.

Choreography
 A Raisin in the Sun (ABC 2008 MOW) – starring Sean Combs, Phylicia Rashad, Sanaa Lathan, Audra McDonald, John Stamos
 Turn the Beat Around
 Repo! The Genetic Opera
 Vibe Awards
 Canadian Idol			
 national commercials

Filmography
Armstrong was featured in the documentary film  Breakin' In: The Making of a Hip Hop Dancer (2005), which highlighted her as one of Canada's top rising stars.

 How She Move
 Save the Last Dance 2
 Repo! The Genetic Opera
 Breakin' In: The Making of a Hip Hop Dancer
 The Next Step Season 2. Nationals presenter.
 Confessions of a Teenage Drama Queen
 Honey
 Shall We Dance?

See also

 List of Canadian actors
 List of choreographers
 List of dancers

External links 
 
 , her official website
 

Place of birth missing (living people)
1978 births
Living people
20th-century Canadian actresses
21st-century Canadian actresses
Black Canadian actresses
Black Canadian broadcasters
Black Canadian dancers
Black Canadian women
Canadian choreographers
Canadian female dancers
Canadian film actresses
Canadian people of African-American descent
Canadian stage actresses
Canadian women choreographers
Film choreographers
Participants in Canadian reality television series
So You Think You Can Dance Canada